Panjeh may refer to:
 Panjeh-ye Olya
 Panjeh-ye Sofla